Salvin's big-eyed bat (Chiroderma salvini) is a species of bat in the family Phyllostomidae. It is found in Bolivia, Colombia, Costa Rica, Ecuador, El Salvador, Guatemala, Honduras, Mexico, Panama, Peru, and Venezuela.

References

Chiroderma
Mammals of Colombia
Mammals described in 1878
Taxonomy articles created by Polbot
Taxa named by George Edward Dobson
Bats of South America
Bats of Central America